Kim Davis (born in Toronto, Ontario) is a Canadian singer-songwriter. After starting her career as a background singer for artists such as John Legend, she began recording and self-releasing solo material in 2007. Davis' lyrics draw from real life experiences, and her music fuses R&B, soul, hip hop, and reggae.  In 2010 her single Show Me The Way was nominated for the Juno Award for Reggae Recording of the Year, and at the Juno Awards of 2014 her second album There's Only One was nominated for the Juno Award for R&B/Soul Recording of the Year. She has collaborated with artists such as Sizzla and Beenie Man, and she continues to tour.

Awards and nominations

Discography

Solo albums

See also
Juno Awards

References

External links
Kim Davis on Facebook
Kim Davis on YouTube

Living people
Musicians from Toronto
Canadian contemporary R&B singers
Canadian singer-songwriters
Canadian women singer-songwriters
Year of birth missing (living people)